A Garage Dayz Nite, is the first E.P. from Beatallica. It contains seven tracks, made from combinations of Beatles and Metallica songs. The cover is a parody of The Beatles' second UK album With The Beatles, while the crude handwriting is a reference to that used in Metallica's The $5.98 E.P. - Garage Days Re-Revisited.

"Sgt. Hetfield's Motorbreath Pub Band", "A Garage Dayz Nite", "For Horsemen" and "...And Justice for All My Loving" were re-recorded for the band's first full-length album Sgt. Hetfield's Motorbreath Pub Band. "The Thing That Should Not Let It Be" and "Everybody's Got a Ticket to Ride Except for Me and My Lightning" were re-recorded for their second album Masterful Mystery Tour.

Track listing
"Sgt. Hetfield's Motorbreath Pub Band"
Lyrical References:
Motörhead
"A Garage Dayz Nite"
Lyrical References:
"Wherever I May Roam"
"Trapped Under Ice"
"Love at First Sting"
"For Horsemen"
Lyrical References:
"King Nothing"
Winger
"No Remorseful Reply"
Lyrical References:
"Creeping Death"
"The Thing That Should Not Let It Be"
Musical References:
"One"
"Fade to Black"
"Everybody's Got a Ticket to Ride Except for Me and My Lightning"
"...And Justice for All My Loving"
Lyrical References:
"Sad but True"
Musical References:
"Helpless"

References

External links
Beatallica official website 

Beatallica albums
2001 debut EPs
2000s comedy albums
Comedy rock EPs